See also Silesia-born mathematician Hermann Amandus Schwarz.

Hermann Schwarz (December 22, 1864 in Düren, Rhenish Prussia – December 1951 in Darmstadt, West Germany) was a German philosopher.  Educated at Halle, where he devoted himself to mathematics and to philosophy, he became professor at Marburg in 1908 and at Greifswald in 1910.  His philosophy was not unlike that of Goswin Uphues.  He edited the Zeitschrift  für Philosophie und philosophische Kritik.

Works
 Das Wahrnehmungsproblem (1892) 
 Was will der kritische Realismus? (1894) 
 Grundzüge der Ethik (1896) 
 Psychologie des Willens zur Grundlegung der Ethik (1900) 
 Das Sittliche Leben (1901) 
 Glück und Sittlichkeit (1902) 
 Der moderne Materialismus (1904; second edition, 1912) 
 Der Gottesgedanke in der Geschichte der Philosophie (1913)  
 Das Ungegebene. Eine Religions- und Werthphilosophie. Tübingen, Mohr-Siebeck Verlag (1921)
 Gott, Jenseits von Theismus und Pantheismus. (1928)
 Nationalsozialistische Weltanschauung. Freie Beitrage zur Philosophie d. Nationalsozialismus aus d. Jahren 1919-1933. Berlin: Junker u. Dunnhaupt (1933)
 Ekkehard der Deutsche. Völkische Religion im Aufgang. Berlin: Junker u. Dunnhaupt, (1935)
 Deutscher Glaube am Scheidewege. Berlin: Junker u Dunnhaupt (1936)
 Die Irminsul als Sinnbild deutschvölkischen Gottesglaubens. Junker u. Dunnhaupt (1937)
 Grundzuge einer Geschichte der artdeutschen Philosophie. Berlin: Junker u. Dunnhaupt (1937)
 Deutsche Gotteserkenntnis einst und jetzt. Stuttgart: Durchbruch-Verl(1938)
 Gesammelte Werke. Berlin: Junker u. Dunnhaupt (1940)
 Ewigkeit. Ein deutsches Bekenntnis. Berlin, Junker u. Dunnhaupt (1941)

External links 
 Website in German
 

1864 births
1951 deaths
German philosophers
German non-fiction writers
Academic staff of the University of Marburg
Academic staff of the University of Greifswald
Martin Luther University of Halle-Wittenberg alumni
People from the Rhine Province
German male non-fiction writers